Mount Neder is a mountain with a small, pointed summit (1,010 m) that surmounts the northwest part of Quam Heights in the Anare Mountains, Victoria Land. Mapped by United States Geological Survey (USGS) from surveys and U.S. Navy air photos, 1960–63. Named by Advisory Committee on Antarctic Names (US-ACAN) for Irving R. Neder, United States Antarctic Research Program (USARP) geologist in the Ohio Range and Wisconsin Range area, 1965–66, and McMurdo Sound area, 1966–67.

Mountains of Victoria Land
Pennell Coast